The Canton of Chambon-sur-Voueize is a former canton situated in the Creuse département and in the Limousin region of central France. It was disbanded following the French canton reorganisation which came into effect in March 2015. It had 3,888 inhabitants (2012).

Geography 
A farming and woodland area, with the town of Chambon-sur-Voueize, in the arrondissement of Aubusson, at its centre. The altitude varies from 293m (Budelière) to 555m (Nouhant) with an average altitude of 409m.

The canton comprised 11 communes:

Auge
Budelière
Chambon-sur-Voueize
Lépaud
Lussat
Nouhant
Saint-Julien-le-Châtel
Saint-Loup
Tardes
Verneiges
Viersat

Population

See also 
 Arrondissements of the Creuse department
 Cantons of the Creuse department
 Communes of the Creuse department

References

Chambon-sur-Voueize
2015 disestablishments in France
States and territories disestablished in 2015